Mesfin Tafesse (born 26 November 2001) is an Ethiopian association footballer who currently plays for Hawassa City of the Ethiopian Premier League, and the Ethiopia national team.

Club career
Tafesse has played for Hawassa City of the Ethiopian Premier League since 2018.

International career
Tafesse made his senior international debut on 8 August 2019 in a 2020 African Nations Championship qualification match against Djibouti. He scored his first international goal in the match, the eventual game-winner, after coming on as a second-half substitute.

International goals
Scores and results list Ethiopia's goal tally first.

International career statistics

References

External links
Teams profile
Soccerway profile

2001 births
Living people
Ethiopian footballers
Association football forwards
2021 Africa Cup of Nations players